The Call of the North is a 1914 American silent adventure-drama film directed by Oscar Apfel and Cecil B. DeMille. It is based on the 1903 novel, The Conjuror's House; a Romance of the Free Forest by Stewart Edward White and its 1908 play adaptation The Call of the North by George Broadhurst. Robert Edeson starred in the play and reprises his role in this film. He played a dual role of both Ned Stewart and his own father, Graehme Stewart.

A copy of the film exists in the George Eastman House Motion Picture Collection. The film was remade by Paramount in 1921 with Jack Holt in the lead role.

Plot
Graehme Stewart is accused of adultery and killed although he was innocent. His son Ned decides to avenge his father, but gets captured and sent on the long journey to death "la longue traverse". Virginia saves his life and the film's villain confesses Ned is innocent.

Cast
 Robert Edeson in a dual role as Ned, and as Graehme Stewart
 Theodore Roberts as Galen Albert
 Winifred Kingston as Virginia
 Horace B. Carpenter as Rand
 Florence Dagmar as Elodie
 Milton Brown as Me-en-gan
 Vera McGarry as Julie
 Jode Mullally as Picard
 Sydney Deane as McTavish
 Fred Montague as Jack Wilson

See also
The House That Shadows Built (1931 promotional film by Paramount)

References

External links

1914 films
1914 drama films
1910s adventure drama films
American silent feature films
Films directed by Cecil B. DeMille
Films directed by Oscar Apfel
American black-and-white films
Films based on American novels
American films based on plays
Films based on adaptations
American adventure drama films
1910s American films
Silent American drama films
Silent adventure drama films